Rua Augusta may refer to:

 Rua Augusta (São Paulo), a street in São Paulo, Brazil
 Rua Augusta (TV series), Brazilian drama television series